"Romantic Lover" is a song by Filipino musician Eyedress, first released as a self-directed music video on YouTube 12 January 2020. On 10 July that year it was announced that the song would be released on his next album, Let's Skip to the Wedding (2020). It was the fourth of nine album tracks to be released as singles from Let's Skip to the Wedding.

Reception
Reviewing the album Let's Skip to the Wedding, PopMatters described "Romantic Lover" as "near-monotone vocals over sharp, looping synths". AllMusic highlighted "themes of love, devotion, and tenderness" in the lyrics.

"Romantic Lover" went viral in the USA with Rolling Stone citing the track as one of the fastest-rising songs on American streaming services for the week ending 6 May 2021. It was the second Eyedress single to become a viral hit in 2021 with "Jealous" going viral on TikTok earlier in the year. The track was certified platinum by the RIAA on 14 March 2023.

Charts

Certifications

References 

2019 songs
2020 singles
Eyedress songs